Blake James Turnell (born 1993), known professionally as Chillinit (stylised as ChillinIT), is an Australian rapper and musician. He is from Sydney, New South Wales and released his debut studio album Women Weed & Wordplay in October 2018.

Career
In August 2019, Turnell released the standalone single "Freedom", which became his first charting single in Australia, which peaked at number 87 on the ARIA Singles Chart.

His second studio album The Octagon was released on 31 January 2020, and peaked at number 2 on the ARIA Albums Chart the week following its release. The album's lead single, "Laying Low", peaked at number 72 on the ARIA Singles Chart in February 2020.

In October 2021, Chillinit released "Susan’s Son", the lead single from his fourth album Family Ties, released in November 2021.

Discography

Studio albums

Extended plays

Singles

As lead artist

As featured artist

Awards and nominations

AIR Awards
The Australian Independent Record Awards (known colloquially as the AIR Awards) is an annual awards night to recognise, promote and celebrate the success of Australia's Independent Music sector.

! 
|-
| 2021
| The Octagon
| Best Independent Hip Hop Album or EP
| 
| 
|-
| 2022
| Family Ties
| Best Independent Hip Hop Album or EP
| 
| 
|}

APRA Awards
The APRA Awards are held in Australia and New Zealand by the Australasian Performing Right Association to recognise songwriting skills, sales and airplay performance by its members annually.

! 
|-
| 2022
| "Stand for" (feat Lisi) (Benjamin Sutton/Blake Turnell/Rilind Kocinaj/Tahlis Poasa)
| Most Performed Hip Hop/Rap Work
| 
| 
|-

ARIA Music Awards
The ARIA Music Awards is an annual awards ceremony that recognises excellence, innovation, and achievement across all genres of Australian music. They commenced in 1987. 

! 
|-
| 2022
| Family Ties
| Best Hip Hop / Rap Release
| 
| 
|-

Concert tours

Headlining
 The Ashes: Women, Weed & Wordplay Tour (2019)
 The Octagon Tour (2020)

Personal life 
Blake is of Lebanese and Australian descent. Turnell's uncle, Sean Turnell, is an Australian economist.

Turnell was arrested by New South Wales Police in December 2021 for not wearing a mandatory face mask and giving a fake ID.

References

External links
 

Australian hip hop musicians
Australian male rappers
Rappers from Sydney
Australian people of Lebanese descent
Living people
1993 births